Sông Cầu is a townlet of Đồng Hỷ District in Thái Nguyên Province, Vietnam.

References

Populated places in Thái Nguyên province
Townships in Vietnam